Galab Spasov Donev (born 28 February 1967) is a Bulgarian politician serving as the caretaker Prime Minister of Bulgaria since 2 August 2022.

An independent politician, he previously served as the minister of labor and social policy in the cabinet of Stefan Yanev. He is an expert in finance, law and social policy and also has an army background.

References 

|-

|-

Government ministers of Bulgaria
Prime Ministers of Bulgaria
1967 births
Living people
University of National and World Economy alumni
Independent politicians in Bulgaria
21st-century Bulgarian politicians